Laizah Ann Bendong (born August 11, 1997) is a Filipina volleyball player who currently plays for the BaliPure Purest Water Defenders in the Premier Volleyball League. She was awarded as the UAAP Best Setter in the UAAP Season 81 volleyball tournaments.

Clubs 
  Cherrylume Iron Lady Warriors (2017)
  Generika-Ayala Lifesavers (2018)
  Foton Tornadoes Blue Energy (2019)
  BaliPure Purest Water Defenders (2021)

Awards

Individual
 '2018 PSL Collegiate Grand Slam Conference "Best Setter"
 2019 UAAP Season 81 "Best Setter"

References 

1997 births
Living people
Setters (volleyball)
University Athletic Association of the Philippines volleyball players
University of the East alumni
Filipino women's volleyball players
21st-century Filipino women